The 1931 Manhattan Jaspers football team was an American football team that represented Manhattan College as an independent during the 1931 college football season. In their second year under head coach John B. Law, the Jaspers compiled a 4–2–1 record.

Schedule

References

Manhattan
Manhattan Jaspers football seasons
Manhattan Jaspers football